Church of Poland, also called Polish Catholic Church is a Polish Old Catholic church in Poland, which is part of the Union of Utrecht. It is a member of the World Council of Churches and the Polish Ecumenical Council. It is not affiliated with the Roman Catholic Church. Bishop Wiktor Wysoczański was chosen as the church's superior in 1995.

List of superiors
 1995–present - Bishop Wiktor Wysoczański (1939–present)

See also
Antoni Naumczyk, administrator of the Polish Catholic Church's Diocese of Warsaw

References

External links

Church official website (pl)

Union of Utrecht of the Old Catholic Churches
Christian denominations in Poland
Independent Catholic denominations
Poland
Members of the World Council of Churches
Christian organizations established in 1924
Christian denominations established in the 20th century
1924 establishments in Poland
Catholicism in Poland